Olympia Jean Snowe (born February 21, 1947) is an American businesswoman and politician who was a United States Senator from Maine from 1995 to 2013. Snowe, a member of the Republican Party, became known for her ability to influence the outcome of close votes, including whether to end filibusters. In 2006, she was named one of America's Best Senators by Time magazine. Throughout her Senate career, she was considered one of the most moderate members of the chamber.

On February 28, 2012, Snowe announced that she would not seek re-election in November 2012, and retired when her third term ended on January 3, 2013. She cited hyper-partisanship leading to a dysfunctional Congress as the reason for her retirement from the Senate. Her seat went to former governor Angus King, a former Democrat and current independent.

Snowe is a senior fellow for the Bipartisan Policy Center and co-chairs its Commission on Political Reform.

Early life

Snowe was born Olympia Jean Bouchles in Augusta, Maine, the daughter of Georgia (née Goranites) and George John Bouchles. Her father emigrated to the United States from Sparti, Greece, and her maternal grandparents were also Greek. She is a member of the Greek Orthodox Church.

When she was eight years old, her mother died of breast cancer, and less than a year later, her father died of heart disease. Orphaned, she was moved to Auburn, to be raised by her aunt and uncle, a textile mill worker and a barber, respectively, along with their five children. Her brother John was raised separately by other family members. Within a few years, disease would also claim her uncle's life. Snowe attended St. Basil's Academy in Garrison, New York, from the third grade to the ninth. One of her teachers was Athena Hatziemmanuel, a notable Greek-American educator at the school. Returning to Auburn, she attended Edward Little High School before entering the University of Maine in Orono, from which she earned a degree in political science (1969). Shortly after graduation, Bouchles married her fiancé, Republican state legislator Peter T. Snowe, on December 29, 1969, in New York City.

Early political career

Snowe entered politics and rose quickly, winning a seat on the Board of Voter Registration and working for Congressman (later U.S. Senator and U.S. Secretary of Defense) William Cohen. Tragedy struck Snowe again in 1973, when her husband was killed in an automobile accident. At the urging of family, friends, neighbors and local leaders, Snowe ran for her husband's Auburn-based seat in the Maine House of Representatives at the age of 26 and won. She was re-elected to the House in 1974, and, in 1976, won election to the Maine Senate, representing Androscoggin County. That same year, she was a delegate to both the state and national Republican conventions.

U.S. House of Representatives
Snowe was elected to the U.S. House of Representatives in 1978 and represented Maine's 2nd Congressional District from 1979 to 1995. The district included most of the northern two-thirds of the state, including Bangor and her hometown of Auburn. She served as a member of the Budget and International Relations Committees.  Snowe voted for the bill establishing Martin Luther King Jr. Day as a federal holiday in August 1983 and the Civil Rights Restoration Act of 1987 in March 1988 (as well as to override President Reagan's veto).

Snowe married John R. McKernan, Jr., then Governor of Maine, in February 1989. Snowe and John McKernan served together in the United States House of Representatives from 1983 to 1986, McKernan representing the 1st District. While Snowe was First Lady of Maine from 1989 to 1995, she served as a member of Congress of the United States.

Tragedy struck Snowe once more in 1991 when her stepson Peter McKernan died from a heart ailment at the age of 20.

U.S. Senate

Elections

In 1994, when Senate Majority Leader George J. Mitchell declined to run for re-election, Snowe immediately declared her candidacy for the seat. The Democratic nominee was her House colleague, 1st District Congressman Tom Andrews. Snowe defeated Andrews 60–36%, carrying every county in the state. Snowe was part of the Republican election sweep of 1994, when the Republican party captured both the House and Senate for the first time since 1954. Snowe was easily re-elected in 2000 over State Senate President Mark Lawrence, increasing her winning margin to 69%–31%. She cruised past Democratic opponent Jean Hay Bright in 2006, winning by 74% to 20.6%. She won every single county in Maine in all three of her elections.

Tenure

Snowe was an important voice during the Senate's 1999 impeachment trial of then-President Bill Clinton. She and fellow Maine Senator Susan Collins sponsored a motion that would have allowed the Senate to vote separately on the charges and the remedy – a "finding of fact" resolution. When the motion failed, Snowe and Collins voted to acquit, arguing that Clinton's perjury did not warrant his removal from office. Her occasional breaks with the Bush administration drew attacks from conservative Republicans; the Club for Growth and Concerned Women for America label her a "Republican In Name Only" (RINO).

In October 2002, Snowe voted in favor of the War in Iraq.

In February 2006, TheWhiteHouseProject.org named Snowe one of its "8 in '08", a group of eight female politicians who could possibly run and/or be elected president in 2008.

Snowe voted in favor of the nominations of John Roberts, Samuel Alito, Sonia Sotomayor, and Elena Kagan to the U.S. Supreme Court.

In April 2006, Snowe was selected by Time as one of "America's 10 Best Senators". She was the only woman so recognized. Time praised Snowe for her sensitivity to her constituents, also noting that: "Because of her centrist views and eagerness to get beyond partisan point scoring, Maine Republican Olympia Snowe is in the center of every policy debate in Washington." She received an honorary degree from Bates College in 1998, and another from the University of Delaware in 2008. Snowe did not miss any of the 657 votes on the Senate floor during the 110th Congress from 2007 to 2009. She was one of only eight senators who did not miss any votes during that session.

Snowe is the fourth woman to serve on the Senate Armed Services Committee and the first to chair its seapower subcommittee which oversees the Navy and Marine Corps. In 2001, Snowe became the first Republican woman to secure a full-term seat on the Senate Finance Committee.

Snowe was the youngest female Republican ever elected to the United States House of Representatives; she is also the first woman to have served in both houses of a state legislature and both houses of the U.S. Congress. She is the first Greek-American congresswoman. With her 1989 marriage to McKernan, she became the first person to simultaneously be a member of Congress and First Lady of a state. She never lost an election in her 35 years as an elected official, and in the 2006 midterm senatorial elections, she won with a reported 73.99% of votes. However, on Tuesday, February 27, 2012, citing excessive partisanship and a dispiriting political environment, Snowe announced she would not run for re-election in November 2012. Her unexpected decision delivered a potential blow to Republicans, who needed just a handful of seats to regain control of the Senate; Snowe was considered one of their safer incumbents.

Gang of 14

On May 23, 2005, Snowe was one of fourteen senators dubbed the Gang of 14, who defused a confrontation between Senate Democrats (who were filibustering several judicial nominees) and the Senate Republican leadership (who wanted to use the nominations as a flashpoint to eliminate filibusters on nominees through the so-called nuclear option). The Gang-brokered compromise precluded further filibusters and the implementation of the nuclear option for the remainder of the 109th Congress; under its terms, the Democrats retained the power to filibuster a Bush judicial nominee in an "extraordinary circumstance", and nominees (Janice Rogers Brown, Priscilla Owen and William Pryor) received a simple majority vote by the full Senate. The Gang later played an important role in the confirmation of Chief Justice John Roberts and Associate Justice Samuel Alito, as they asserted that neither met the "extraordinary circumstances" provision outlined in their agreement. Snowe ultimately voted for both Roberts and Alito.

Committee assignments

 Committee on Commerce, Science, and Transportation
 Subcommittee on Aviation Operations, Safety, and Security
 Subcommittee on Communications, Technology, and the Internet
 Subcommittee on Consumer Protection, Product Safety, and Insurance
 Subcommittee on Oceans, Atmosphere, Fisheries, and Coast Guard (Ranking Member)
 Subcommittee on Science and Space
 Subcommittee on Surface Transportation and Merchant Marine Infrastructure, Safety, and Security
 Committee on Finance
 Subcommittee on Health Care
 Subcommittee on Taxation, IRS Oversight, and Long-term Growth
 Subcommittee on International Trade and Global Competitiveness
 Committee on Small Business and Entrepreneurship (Ranking Member)
 Select Committee on Intelligence

Caucus memberships
 Dairy Farmer Caucus
 Health Technology Caucus (Co-Chair)
 International Conservation Caucus (Co-Chair)
 Senate Tourism Caucus
 Senate Women's Caucus
 Sportsmen's Caucus
 Senate Hunger Caucus
 Senate Oceans Caucus

Political positions

Snowe shares a centrist ideology with Susan Collins, her former colleague in the Senate from Maine, who still serves in the chamber. Collins is considered a "half-turn more conservative" than Snowe. Snowe supports abortion rights and gay rights, and though she previously voted to block the repeal of "Don't ask, don't tell", she was one of eight Republican senators to vote for the act's repeal on December 18, 2010, ending the policy. In her 2006 re-election campaign, she was one of two Republican Senate candidates endorsed by the prominent gay rights organization the Human Rights Campaign (the other was Lincoln Chafee of Rhode Island, who became a Democrat in 2013 and a Libertarian in 2019). According to GovTrack, Snowe was the most liberal Republican senator in 2012–13 being placed by GovTrack's analysis to the left of every Republican and several Democrats. In 2012, the non-partisan National Journal gave Snowe a composite 57% conservative score and a 43% liberal score.

Snowe supported both President Clinton's involvement in Kosovo and President George W. Bush's invasions in Afghanistan and Iraq. On fiscal issues, she has voiced support for cutting taxes as economic stimulus, although she joined fellow Republican senators Lincoln Chafee and John McCain in voting against the Jobs and Growth Tax Relief Reconciliation Act of 2003. In 2004, she opposed the accelerated implementation of the Bush tax cuts citing budget concerns and she was joined by Senators Collins, McCain, and Chafee. 

Snowe is a member of the Republican Main Street Partnership and supports stem cell research. She is also a member of Republicans for Environmental Protection, the Republican Majority for Choice, Republicans for Choice and The Wish List (Women In the Senate and House), a group of pro-choice Republican women. Her highest composite conservative score according to the National Journal was a 63% in 2010 and her highest composite liberal score was a 55.5% in 2006. She voted against the Federal Marriage Amendment, an amendment aimed at banning gay marriage, in 2004. She voted against banning gay marriage in 2006 for a second time. In 2005 and 2007, she voted to support embryonic stem-cell research. In 2008, Snowe endorsed Republican candidate John McCain for President of the United States.

In the 111th Congress, Snowe backed the release of additional Troubled Asset Relief Program (TARP) funds and the American Recovery and Reinvestment Act. While she opposed President Obama's budget resolution, she pledged to work in a bipartisan manner on the issues of health care reform and energy.

In 2007, Olympia Snowe was among the Republicans who voted in favor of the McCain-Kennedy bill to give citizenship to undocumented immigrants. However, she voted against the DREAM Act in 2010. She also voted to continue funding to 'sanctuary cities,' voted against eliminating the 'Y' guestworker visa program, but she also voted in favor of building a fence along the southern border and voted to make English the official language of the United States.

"In October 2009, Snowe was the sole Republican in the Senate to vote for the Finance Committee’s health care reform bill." However, she stated that she might not support the final bill due to strong reservations. Snowe was one of three Republicans to break with their party and vote with Democrats to end a filibuster of a defense spending bill; the filibuster was meant to delay or stop the vote on health care legislation. In December 2009, Snowe voted against cloture for two procedural motions and ultimately against the Senate Health Care Reform Bill. Snowe again voted against health care reform when she voted "no" on the Health Care and Education Reconciliation Act of 2010.

When Snowe announced in February 2012 that she would not seek re-election, it was reported that she and Democrat Ben Nelson, who also did not seek re-election, had the closest overlap  of any two members of the U.S. Senate.

In 2012, Snowe endorsed Republican candidate Mitt Romney for President of the United States. After leaving the Senate, Snowe announced her support for same-sex marriage.

Snowe has been on the board of directors for the investment counsel firm T. Rowe Price since 2013. She opposed Donald Trump as the GOP nominee in 2016. She said that Jeb Bush and Hillary Clinton were the least partisan 2016 presidential candidates.

On November 8, 2020, five days after the election, while President Trump and some other members of the Republican Party were falsely claiming he had won the election, Snowe congratulated President-elect Joe Biden and Vice President-elect Kamala Harris. On January 9, 2021, following the January 6 United States Capitol attack, she called on President Trump to "resign from office now to allow our nation to begin to heal and prepare for the transition to the Biden presidency."

Electoral history

See also
 Women in the United States House of Representatives
 Women in the United States Senate
 Rockefeller Republican

References

Further reading
 Nine & Counting: The Women of the Senate, Boxer, Collins, Snowe et al., .
 Fighting for Common Ground: How We can Fix the Stalemate in Congress, Snowe,

External links

 U.S. Senator Olympia Snowe official U.S. Senate website
 Olympia Snowe for Senate official campaign website
 
 
 Profile at SourceWatch
 U.S. Senator Olympia Snowe audio clips from the Senate Republican Conference
 "The Anguished Moderate", The Washington Post, July 15, 2007.
 Olympia Snowe  Video produced by Makers: Women Who Make America

|-

|-

|-

|-

|-

|-

1947 births
Living people
20th-century American politicians
20th-century Eastern Orthodox Christians
20th-century American women politicians
21st-century American politicians
21st-century Eastern Orthodox Christians
21st-century American women politicians
American people of Greek descent
Bipartisan Policy Center
Female members of the United States House of Representatives
Female United States senators
First Ladies and Gentlemen of Maine
Greek Orthodox Christians from the United States
Republican Party Maine state senators
Centrism in the United States
Republican Party members of the Maine House of Representatives
People from Falmouth, Maine
Politicians from Augusta, Maine
Republican Party members of the United States House of Representatives from Maine
Republican Party United States senators from Maine
University of Maine alumni
Women state legislators in Maine
Edward Little High School alumni